Mikhail Pavlovich Danilov (15 May 1825 – 17 January 1906) was an Imperial Russian general and corps commander. He fought in the Crimean War, the January Uprising in Poland and the Russo-Turkish War of 1877–1878.

Rank
Second Lieutenant: 1846
Poruchik: 1848
Stabskapitän: 1851
Captain: 1854
Colonel: 1859
Major general: 1868
Lieutenant general: 1878
General: 1898

Awards
Order of Saint Vladimir, 4th class, 1854
Order of Saint Stanislaus (House of Romanov), 1st class, 1870
Order of Saint Anna, 1st class, 1874
Order of Saint George, 4th degree, 1877
Order of Saint Vladimir, 2nd class, 1879
Order of the White Eagle (Russian Empire), 1880
Order of Saint Alexander Nevsky

People of the Crimean War
Russian people of the January Uprising
Russian military personnel of the Russo-Turkish War (1877–1878)
Recipients of the Order of St. Vladimir, 4th class
Recipients of the Order of Saint Stanislaus (Russian), 1st class
Recipients of the Order of St. Anna, 1st class
Recipients of the Order of St. Vladimir, 2nd class
Recipients of the Order of the White Eagle (Russia)
1825 births
1906 deaths
Russian nobility